Wangcun may refer to the following locations in China:

 Wangcun Subdistrict (王村街道), Kuangqu, Datong, Shanxi

Towns 
 Wangcun, Xiuning County (汪村镇), Anhui
 Wangcun, Dacheng County (旺村镇), Hebei
Written as "王村镇":
 Wangcun, She County, Anhui
 Wangcun, Gansu, in Jingchuan County
 Wangcun, Xingyang, Henan
 Wangcun, Xinxiang, in Muye District, Xinxiang, Henan
 Wangcun, Heyang County, Shaanxi
 Wangcun, Qian County, Shaanxi
 Wangcun, Jimo, Shandong
 Wangcun, Zibo, in Zhoucun District, Zibo, Shandong
 Wangcun, Xiangyuan County, Shanxi
 Wangcun, Sichuan, in Jingyan County

Townships 
The following entries are all written as "王村乡":
 Wangcun Township, Daming County, Hebei
 Wangcun Township, Laishui County, Hebei
 Wangcun Township, Fengqiu County, Henan
 Wangcun Township, Nanyang, Henan, in Wolong District, Nanyang, Henan
 Wangcun Township, Shanxi, in Jingle County